Alli Ragan (born June 16, 1992) is an American freestyle wrestler. She is a two-time silver medalist at the World Wrestling Championships.

Career 

In 2013, she represented the United States at the Summer Universiade and she won the silver medal in the women's 59 kg event.

She won the silver medal in the women's freestyle 60 kg event at the 2016 World Wrestling Championships held in Budapest, Hungary and in that same event at the 2017 World Wrestling Championships held in Paris, France.

Achievements

References

External links 
 

Living people
Place of birth missing (living people)
American female sport wrestlers
World Wrestling Championships medalists
Universiade medalists in wrestling
Medalists at the 2013 Summer Universiade
Universiade silver medalists for the United States
1992 births
Pan American Wrestling Championships medalists
21st-century American women